XQuery API for Java (XQJ) refers to the common Java API for the W3C XQuery 1.0 specification.

The XQJ API enables Java programmers to execute XQuery against an XML data source (e.g. an XML database) while reducing or eliminating vendor lock in.

The XQJ API provides Java developers with an interface to the XQuery Data Model. Its design is similar to the JDBC API which has a client/server feel and as such lends itself well to Server-based XML Databases and less well to client-side XQuery processors, although the "connection" part is a very minor part of the entire API. Users of the XQJ API can bind Java values to XQuery expressions, preventing code injection attacks. Also, multiple XQuery expressions can be executed as part of an atomic transaction.

History and implementation

The XQuery API for Java was developed at the Java Community Process as JSR 225. It had some big technology backers such as Oracle, IBM, BEA Systems, Software AG, Intel, Nokia and DataDirect.

Version 1.0 of the XQuery API for Java Specification was released on June 24, 2009, along with JavaDocs, a reference implementation and a TCK (Technology Compatibility Kit) which implementing vendors must conform to.

The XQJ classes are contained in the Java package javax.xml.xquery

There is no (visible) activity to create a version of XQJ that provides support for XQuery 3.0 or 3.1, for example by providing Java bindings for additions to the data model such as functions, arrays, or maps.

Functionality

XQJ allows multiple implementations to exist and be used by the same application.

XQJ connections support creating and executing XQuery expressions. Expressions may be updating and may include full text searches. XQJ represents XQuery expressions using one of the following classes:

 XQExpression – the expression is sent to the XQuery processor every time.
 XQPreparedExpression – the expression is cached and the execution path is pre-determined allowing it to be executed multiple times in an efficient manner.

XQuery expressions return a result sequence of XDM items which in XQJ are represented through the XQResultSequence interface. The programmer can use an XQResultSequence to walk over individual XDM items in the result sequence. Each item in the sequence has XDM type information associated with it, such as its node type e.g. XDM type information in XQJ can be retrieved via the XQItemType interface.

Atomic XQuery items can be easily cast to Java primitives via XQItemAccessor methods such as getByte() and getFloat(). Also XQuery items and sequences can be serialized to DOM , SAX , StAX  and the generic IO  and  classes.

Examples

Basic example

The following example illustrates creating a connection to an XML Database, submitting an XQuery expression, then processing the results in Java. Once all of the results have been processed, the connection is closed to free up all resources associated with it.

// Create a new connection to an XML database
XQConnection conn = vendorDataSource.getConnection("myUser", "myPassword");

XQExpression expr = conn.createExpression(); // Create a reusable XQuery Expression object

XQResultSequence result = expr.executeQuery(
  "for $n in fn:collection('catalog')//item " +
  "return fn:data($n/name)"); // execute an XQuery expression

// Process the result sequence iteratively
while (result.next()) {
    // Print the current item in the sequence
    System.out.println("Product name: " + result.getItemAsString(null));
}

// Free all resources created by the connection
conn.close();

Binding a value to an external variable

The following example illustrates how a Java value can be bound to an external variable in an XQuery expression.
Assume that the connection  already exists:

XQExpression expr = conn.createExpression();

// The XQuery expression to be executed
String es = "declare variable $x as xs:integer external;" +
            " for $n in fn:collection('catalog')//item" +
            " where $n/price <= $x" +
            " return fn:data($n/name)";

// Bind a value (21) to an external variable with the QName x
expr.bindInt(new QName("x"), 21, null);

// Execute the XQuery expression
XQResultSequence result = expr.executeQuery(es);

// Process the result (sequence) iteratively
while (result.next()) {
    // Process the result ...
}

Default data type mapping

Mapping between Java and XQuery data types is largely flexible, however the XQJ 1.0 specification does have default mapping rules mapping data types when they are not specified by the user. These mapping rules bear great similarities to the mapping rules found in JAXB.

The following table illustrates the default mapping rules for when binding Java values to external variables in XQuery expressions.

Known implementations

Native XML databases

The following is a list of Native XML Databases which are known to have XQuery API for Java implementations.

 MarkLogic
 eXist
 BaseX
 Sedna
 Oracle XDB
 Tamino
 TigerLogic

Relational databases

DataDirect provide XQJ adapters for relational databases, by translating XQuery code into SQL on the fly, then converting SQL result sets into a format suitable for XQJ to process further. The following is a couple of known implementations.

 Oracle DB (Not XDB)
 IBM Db2
 Microsoft SQL Server
 Sybase ASE
 Informix
 MySQL
 PostgreSQL

Non-database implementations

The following is a list of non-database XQuery processors which provide an XQuery API for Java interface (typically allowing query against documents parsed from XML in filestore, and held in memory as DOM or similar trees).

 Saxon XSLT and XQuery processor
 Zorba
 MXQuery
 Oracle XQuery Processor

License

The specification is marked as "Copyright © 2003, 2006 - 2009 Oracle. All rights reserved."

The specification contains two separate licenses: a "specification license" and a "reference implementation license".

The specification license allows free copying of the specification provided that copyright notices are retained; it also grants a license to create and distribute an implementation of the
specification provided that it fully implements the entire specification, that it does not modify or extend any interfaces, and that it passes the compatibility tests.

This provision has caused some controversy. Firstly, it is not universally accepted that implementing a published specification is something that requires a license (that is, that copyright law would disallow this in the absence of a license). Secondly, the license does not meet the criteria to qualify as an open source license (see Open Source Definition), because of the ban on making extensions and modifications. This has led some open source enthusiasts to challenge whether XQJ implementations can ever be considered truly open source.

The license for the reference implementation is a fairly conventional BSD-style open source license.

References

External links
 Javadoc for XQJ
 XQJ Tutorial
 Building Bridges from Java to XQuery, Charles Foster. XML Prague 2012 (Prezi Presentation)
 Java Integration of XQuery, Hans-Jürgen Rennau. Balisage 2010
 Orbeon Forms using XQJ
 Spring Integration XQuery Support
 XQS: XQuery for Scala (Sits on top of XQJ)
 IntelliJ XQuery Support plugin

Java APIs
Java specification requests
XML data access
Java API for XML
Database APIs